A. W. Black  may refer to:
Arthur Black (Liberal politician) (1863–1947), Nottingham businessman and Member of Parliament (MP) for Biggleswade 1906–1918
Alexander William Black (1859–1906), MP for Banffshire 1900–1906